West Mill is the name of a number of mills.

Windmills

West Mill, Billinghay, a windmill in Lincolnshire
West Mill, Brighton, a windmill in East Sussex
West Mill, Briston, a windmill in Norfolk
West Mill, Findsbury Fields, Clerkenwell, a windmill in Middlesex
West Mill, Corringham, a windmill in Lincolnshire
West Mill, Great Chesterford, a windmill in Essex
West Mill, Halstead, a windmill in Essex
West Mill, Hardwick, a windmill in Norfolk
West Mill, Hornsea,  a windmill in the East Riding of Yorkshire
West Mill, Keyingham,  a windmill in the East Riding of Yorkshire
West Mill, Kimberley, a windmill in Nottinghamshire
West Mill, Pinchbeck, a windmill in Lincolnshire
West Mill, Pulham St Mary, a windmill in Norfolk
West Mill, Rettendon, a windmill in Essex
West Mill, Smarden, a windmill in Kent
West Mill, Southminster, a windmill in Essex
West Mill, West Boldon, a Co Durham